The tenth and final season of JAG premiered on CBS on September 24, 2004, and concluded on April 29, 2005. The season, starring David James Elliott and Catherine Bell, was produced by Belisarius Productions in association with Paramount Network Television. 

Season 10 of JAG aired alongside the second season of NCIS.

Plot 
Chief of Staff Lieutenant Colonel Sarah "Mac" MacKenzie (Catherine Bell), a tenacious, by-the-book Marine Corps judge advocate, and Commander Harmon "Harm" Rabb, Jr. (David James Elliott), a former naval aviator turned lawyer, are employed by Headquarters of the Judge Advocate General, the internal law firm of the Department of the Navy. The JAG team prosecute, defend, and preside over the legal cases under the Uniform Code of Military Justice (UCMJ) assigned to them by the Judge Advocate General, Major General Gordon Cresswell (David Andrews). This season, Mac and Harm must investigate the death of a Marine in a friendly fire incident ("Corporate Raiders"), a 22-year-old murder case ("Retrial"), an Ensign who fired on a fishing boat ("Whole New Ball Game"), and a DOD mishap in Baghdad ("This Just In From Baghdad"). Also this season, Mac suffers a personal loss ("Hail and Farewell"), and travels to San Diego to head a criminal investigation ("JAG: San Diego"), while new officers Lieutenants Gregory Vukovic (Chris Beetem), Tali Mayfield (Meta Golding), and Catherine Graves (Jordana Spiro) are assigned to her staff, Jennifer Coates (Zoe McLellan) is tapped to be a juror ("The Sixth Juror"), Harm must face the loss of Mattie (Hallee Hirsh) ("Death at the Mosque"), Bud Roberts (Patrick Labyorteaux) and Harriet Sims (Karri Turner) must decide their future, and Sturgis Turner (Scott Lawrence) is forced to act as the Acting Judge Advocate General. Finally, Harm and Mac must confront their feelings for one-another as they are offered promotions that will lead to their separation, Mac is assigned to Joint Legal Forces Southwest, and Harm is offered a Captain's billet in London ("Fair Winds and Following Seas").

Production 
In February 2005, series co-star David James Elliott announced his departure from the series, with Bellisario noting that "his contract was up, and we never expected it to go on. We had to cut costs. [So] we started doing episodes with less of David, and it became obvious to him that we were not going to renegotiate". Both Catherine Bell and Chris Beetem had signed on for a potential eleventh season. "'It was always intended that Catherine would be [on] the show next season but [Elliott] would not,' says Bellisario".

In Spring 2005, despite CBS informing Donald P. Bellisario that the series "may get picked up", JAG was cancelled. Bellisario stated that "the reason JAG is not coming back is purely demographic. Nothing more", adding "it's wrong to say the show was canceled because [series co-star David James Elliott] said he was leaving".

Cast and characters

Main

Also starring

Recurring

Episodes

See also
 2004–2005 United States network television schedule
 NCIS (franchise)

Notes

References

External links 
 Season 10 on IMDb
 Season 10 on TV.com
 Season 10 on TV Guide

10
2004 American television seasons
2005 American television seasons